Statue of Avetik Isahakyan is a monumental statue. It is situated in front of the Gyumri theater in Gyumri theater square in Shirak Province, Armenia.

History 
The statue was built by sculptor Nikolay Nikoghosyan the memory of Avetik Isahakyan, a famous Armenian poet, writer, academician, member of the Armenian Academy of Sciences and a prominent public figure and was built in 1988.

Description  
The monument is situated in front of the Gyumri theater in Gyumri theater square in Shirak Province, Armenia. It is mainly made of bronze.

Gallery

References

Monuments and memorials in Armenia